Figlio delle stelle is a 1979 Italian comedy film directed by Carlo Vanzina.

Cast
Alan Sorrenti as Daniel
Jennifer as Barbara 
Annie Marie Carell as Gloria  
Tommy Polgár as Tumba

References

External links

1979 films
Films directed by Carlo Vanzina
1970s Italian-language films
1979 comedy films
Italian comedy films
1970s Italian films